The Game of Love (German: Das Spiel mit der Liebe) is a 1928 German silent film directed by Victor Janson and starring Harry Liedtke, Hilda Rosch and Kurt Vespermann.

The film's art direction was by Botho Hoefer and Hans Minzloff.

Cast
 Harry Liedtke as Harry Kent  
 Hilda Rosch as Miss Lilian Tompson / Marchesa Beatrice de Castell  
 Kurt Vespermann as Günther Hilpert  
 Iwa Wanja as Kitty Hilpert  
 Victor Janson as Juan Borgo  
 Alex Sascha as Allgeier

References

Bibliography
 Hans-Michael Bock and Tim Bergfelder. The Concise Cinegraph: An Encyclopedia of German Cinema. Berghahn Books, 2009.

External links

1928 films
Films of the Weimar Republic
German silent feature films
Films directed by Victor Janson
German black-and-white films